The 11th StarDance series was premiered on October 16, 2021 and ended on December 18, 2021. Hosts in this series are again Marek Eben and Tereza Kostková.

Competitors

References 

10
2021 Czech television seasons